The Kitzsteinhorn is a mountain in the High Tauern range of the Central Eastern Alps in Austria. It is part of the Glockner Group and reaches a height of  AA. The Kitzsteinhorn Glaciers are a popular ski area.

Geography
The mountain is located north of the Alpine crest within the municipal area of Kaprun, Salzburg. It was first climbed in 1828 by local mountaineer Johann Entacher.

Climate change 
Since the first comprehensive studies of the glacier in the 1960s, some scientists have measured a reduction of glacier surface area by more than two-thirds in 2022.

Ski area

Skiing on Mt Kitzsteinhorn already began in the early 20th century, when the German and Austrian Alpine Club erected a mountain hut (Krefelder Hütte) in 1907-09. The first cable car was put into operation in December 1965, and opened up the Schmiedingerkees and Maurerkees glaciers, making it the first glacier ski slope in the Austrian Alps. Nevertheless, the resort has to deal with environmental impacts and the global retreat of glaciers since 1850.

This funicular was the location of the Kaprun disaster in which 155 people died on 11 November 2000. To replace the funicular, Gletscherjet I (Glacier Jet I), a 24-person funitel, was brought into service on 23 December 2001. Gletscherjet II, a gondola lift, followed in the next year, opening on 19 October 2002.

Notes and references

External links

 Gletscherbahnen Kaprun AG

Glaciers of Austria
Landforms of Salzburg (state)
Mountains of the Alps
Mountains of Salzburg (state)
Ski areas and resorts in Austria
Glaciers of the Alps
Glockner Group